Al Shaqab  is Qatar Foundation’s (QF) equestrian center in the Al Shagub district, Qatar. Founded in 1992 by Sheikh Hamad Bin Khalifa Al-Thani, Emir of Qatar, Al Shaqab joined QF in 2004. Al Shaqab is now the region's leading equine education resource center and features the breeding of Arabian horses.

History 

Centuries before natural gas and petroleum gave prominence to Qatar as one of the world's fastest growing economies, the country was known for its prized Arabian horses.

When the Al Thani ancestors, the ruling family of the State of Qatar, migrated out of the Arabian Desert three centuries ago to settle in Qatar, the Arabian horse was a vital part of daily life. The Arabian horse played an important role in the founding of Qatar.

Al Shaqab takes its name from a historic battle against the Ottomans. Taking place in the town of Al Rayyan in 1893, the Battle of Al Wajbah, or Al Shaqab as it is also known, saw the Qataris, led by Sheikh Jassim bin Mohammed Al Thani, defeat the Ottomans. This historic battle eventually led to Qatar's independence.

The emir Sheikh Hamad Bin Khalifa Al Thani established Al Shaqab in 1992. In honour of his ancestor, Sheikh Jassim bin Mohammed Al Thani, he chose to establish the breeding farm at the site of the Al Shaqab battle. In 2004, Al Shaqab became a member of Qatar Foundation.

The facility covers some 980,000 square metres and has a stable capacity for more than 400 horses.

The breeding program is intended to preserve the Arabian breed and to produce horses that are beautiful, athletic, and have character and kindness. They must be physically strong to carry their riders.

The breeding program is divided into three categories: international Arabian horses, combining all Arabian bloodlines; straight Egyptian Arabians, as defined by the Pyramid Society; and the traditional Qatari bloodlines of the past.

In 2008, the Al Shaqab team finished second out of the 24 competing countries to earn the silver medal in the competition.

See also
Qatar National Day

References

External links 
 Qatar Foundation: Education, Research, and Community Development
 Home | Al Shaqab

Sports organizations established in 1992
Sports organisations of Qatar
1992 establishments in Qatar
Equestrian organizations
Equestrian sports in Qatar
Venues of the 2030 Asian Games
Asian Games equestrian venues